Thomas Ashe (1770–1835) was an Irish novelist and miscellaneous writer.

Biography
Ashe was the third son of a half-pay officer, and was born at Glasnevin, near Dublin, 15 July 1770. He received a commission in the 83rd regiment of foot, which, however, was almost immediately afterwards disbanded; and he was sent to a counting-house at Bordeaux. There he suffered a short imprisonment for wounding in a duel a gentleman whose sister he had seduced, but, the wound not proving fatal, the prosecution was not persisted in.

Returning to Dublin, Ashe was appointed secretary to the Diocesan and Endowed Schools Commission, but, getting into debt, resigned his office and retired to Switzerland. He then spent several years in foreign travel, living, according to his own account, in a free and unconstrained fashion, and experiencing a somewhat chequered fortune.

In his later years Ashe was short of money. He died at Bath on 17 December 1835.

Works
Besides recording in his Memoirs his impressions of the countries he visited, Ashe published separately:

 Travels in America in 1806, 1808; 
 Memoirs of Mammoth and other Bones found in the vicinity of the Ohio, 1806; and 
 A Commercial and Geographical Sketch of Brazil and Madeira, 1812.
 History of the Azores,1813.

He was also the author of novels, including the Spirit of the Book, 1811, 4th edition 1812; the Liberal Critic, or Henry Percy, 1812: and the Soldier of Fortune, 1816.

Notes

References

People from Glasnevin
1770 births
1835 deaths
18th-century Irish novelists
19th-century Irish novelists
19th-century travel writers
British duellists
Irish travel writers
Irish male novelists
19th-century male writers
Writers from Dublin (city)